Vyacheslav Georgiyevich Sobchenko (born 18 April 1949 in Stalinabad) was a water polo player who competed for the Soviet Union in the 1972 and the 1980 Summer Olympics. He played for the Trud team (Moscow) and the Navy CSK.

See also
 Soviet Union men's Olympic water polo team records and statistics
 List of Olympic champions in men's water polo
 List of Olympic medalists in water polo (men)
 List of men's Olympic water polo tournament goalkeepers

External links
 

1949 births
Living people
Sportspeople from Dushanbe
Soviet male water polo players
Russian male water polo players
Water polo goalkeepers
Olympic water polo players of the Soviet Union
Water polo players at the 1972 Summer Olympics
Water polo players at the 1980 Summer Olympics
Olympic gold medalists for the Soviet Union
Olympic medalists in water polo
Medalists at the 1980 Summer Olympics
Medalists at the 1972 Summer Olympics